is a Japanese professional boxer. She is a former four-time mini-flyweight world champion, having held the WBA title from 2009 to 2013; the IBF title from 2015 to 2017; and the WBO title twice between 2018 and October 2021.

Professional career
Tada made her professional debut on 9 May 2008, scoring a six-round unanimous decision (UD) victory against Napaporn Boonchuon at the Korakuen Hall in Tokyo, Japan.

After compiling a record of 4–0 (2 KOs) she captured her first world title, defeating WBA female mini-flyweight champion ChoRong Son via ten-round UD on 11 April 2009 at the Osaka Prefectural Gymnasium in Osaka, Japan. One judge scored the bout 99–91 and the other two scored it 98–92.

Two fights later she faced WBC female light-flyweight champion Naomi Togashi on 6 December 2009 at the ATC Hall in Osaka, with both of their respective titles on the line. After a closely contested fight over ten rounds, both champions retained their titles through a split draw with one judge scoring the bout 97–93 in favour of Tada, another scoring it 96–94 for Togashi, and the third judge scoring it even at 95–95.

Her next fight came against Ria Ramnarine on 24 April 2010 at the Central Indoor Regional Auditorium in Chaguanas, Trinidad and Tobago, with the WIBA interim mini-flyweight title also up for grabs. In a fight which saw Tada suffer a cut from an accidental clash of heads in round six, she retained her title with a second consecutive draw. Two judges scored the bout even at 95–95 while the third judge scored it 97–93 in favour of Ramnarine.

Tada made six successful defences of her WBA title before facing former world champion Anabel Ortiz on 23 July 2013 at the Tokyo Big Sight. Tada suffered the first defeat of her career, losing via split decision (SD) with one judge scoring the bout 97–93 in favour of Tada while the other two scored it 96–94 for Ortiz. Following an eighth-round technical knockout (TKO) victory against Rathsada Sor Worasin in May 2014, Tada suffered her second career defeat against Ortiz in a November rematch, again losing by SD.

She bounced back from this defeat with a sixth-round TKO victory against Chamagorn Sithaithong in April 2015, before facing Kareli Lopez for the vacant IBF female mini-flyweight title on 11 December at the Central Gym in Kobe, Japan. Tada defeated Lopez via UD to capture her second world title, with the judges' scorecards reading 97–93, 96–92, 96–94. Following a TKO victory against Pornpimon Pongpaew in a non-title fight in June 2016, Tada suffered her third defeat, losing her title via SD against Zongju Cai on 30 January 2017 at the Cotai Arena in Macau.

In her next fight she defeated Naoko Shibata on 10 November, capturing the vacant WBO Asia Pacific mini-flyweight title via eight-round UD at the Korakuen Hall, with the judges scorecards reading 80–72, 78–74, and 77–75. 

Following this victory, Tada challenged WBO female mini-flyweight champion Kayoko Ebata on 1 December 2018 at the Osaka Prefectural Gymnasium. In a bout which Tada fought with an injured ankle that she picked up during training three weeks prior to the fight, she suffered a knockdown en route to a UD victory to become a three-time mini-flyweight world champion. Two judges scored the bout 98–92 and the third judge scored it 97–93.

Tada vacated her WBO title and moved up in weight in order to pursue a world title in a second division. She defeat Kanyarat Yoohanngoh via TKO in April 2019, with the bout serving as a final eliminator for the WBC female light-flyweight title.

She then moved back down to mini-flyweight in an attempt to become a four-time world champion, facing former champion Ayaka Miyao for the WBO title which Tada had previously vacated. The bout took place on 28 January 2020 at the Korakuen Hall. After ten closely rounds, the fight ended in a split draw to leave the WBO title vacant. One judge scored the bout in favour of Tada with 96–94, the second judge gave the same score in favour of Miyao, while the third judge scored it even at 95–95. The fighters returned to the Korakuen Hall on 3 December for a rematch. Tada would emerge the victor in the second attempt, scoring a TKO with a counter left hook eight seconds into the ninth round, capturing the vacant WBO title to become a four-time world champion. At the time of the stoppage, Tada was ahead on all three judges scorecards with 78–74, 78–74, and 78–75.

Professional boxing record

References

External links

Living people
1989 births
Japanese women boxers
Sportspeople from Hyōgo Prefecture
International Boxing Federation champions
World Boxing Association champions
World Boxing Organization champions
World mini-flyweight boxing champions